Hovhannes-Smbat III was King of Ani (1020–1040). He succeeded his father Gagik I of Ani (989–1020) being the king's elder son and legal heir to the throne.

Life
His enthronement in 1020 was strongly opposed by his younger brother Ashot, who one year later in 1021 rebelled against him, driving his forces to Ani the capital, surrounding and conquering the city and dethroning his brother Hovhannes-Smbat III in 1021 and usurping power from him.

But following a compromise agreement between the two feuding brothers, he agreed to withdraw his rebel forces from Ani and let the legal heir Hovhannes-Smbat III to return to power continuing as Hovhannes-Smbat III of Ani on limited areas around the capital, whereas Ashot (known as Ashot IV) would be enthroned a concurrent king and rule in further Armenian provinces closer to Persia and Georgia. Despite the agreed compromise, conflicts, sometimes military, continued between the two brother kings thus greatly weakening the Armenian Bagratid kingdom. In the winter of 1021/2 Hovhannes-Smbat was compelled to make the Byzantine emperor Basil II his heir, an arrangement imposed on him on account of the Armenian support to King George I of Georgia in the Georgian-Byzantine war. Hovhannes-Smbat's heritage eventually passed to the Byzantine Empire in 1042, long after Basil had died.

References

Bagratuni dynasty
Kings of Bagratid Armenia
11th-century monarchs in Asia
Basil II
11th-century monarchs in the Middle East
11th-century Armenian people